The Old Clock at Ronneberga (Swedish: Klockan på Rönneberga) is a 1944 Swedish drama film directed by Gunnar Skoglund and starring Lauritz Falk, Vibeke Falk and Hilda Borgström. It was shot at the Råsunda Studios in Stockholm. The film's sets were designed by the art director Nils Svenwall.

Cast
 Signhild Björkman as 	Narrator
 Lauritz Falk as 	Lennart Heijken
 Vibeke Falk as 	Viveka Langenfeldt
 Sten Sture Modéen as 	Gunnar Heijken
 Gun Robertson as 	Eva Heijken 
 Monica Tropp as 	Vivan
 Sten Lindgren as 	Brolin
 Jullan Kindahl as 	Madame Hallström
 Hilda Borgström as 	Sara
 Oscar Ljung as 	Henrik Heijken
 Hartwig Fock as 	Jerker Boman
 Birgit Chenon as 	Elisabet Heijken
 Gunnar Olsson as 	Clock salesman
 Glann Gustafsson as 	Marianne, Lennart's sister
 Lil Germudson as	Ebba, Lennart's sister
 Signe Enwall as 	Sofi
 Nils Dahlgren as Major
 Erik Hell as Lieutenant Gerhard Grijp
 Kotti Chave as 	Lieutenant Bergencrona
 Gustaf Hiort af Ornäs as 	Lieutenant Malm
 Ivar Kåge as Colonel
 Åke Jensen as Lieutenant Birger Langenfeldt
 Gerda Björne as	Mayor's wife
 Wiktor Andersson as	Lindgren, groom
 Barbro Fleege as 	Mally
 Kerstin Holmberg as 	Beate
 Gabriel Rosén as 	Baron at the mayor's party
 Åke Fridell as 	Legal clerk at the mayor's party
 Gösta Gustafson as Ko-Johan Johansson
 Helge Hagerman s	Lindström
 Carl Ström as Forsberg, forester
 Anders Frithiof as 	Banker
 Rolf Gregor as Karlsson, stablehand
 Henry Lundqvist as Johan
 Viveka Magnét as Maja
 Erik Sundqvist as 	Erik, Johan's rival
 Lasse Krantz as	August Johansson

References

Bibliography 
 Qvist, Per Olov & von Bagh, Peter. Guide to the Cinema of Sweden and Finland. Greenwood Publishing Group, 2000.

External links 
 

1944 films
Swedish drama films
1944 drama films
1940s Swedish-language films
Films directed by Gunnar Skoglund
Swedish black-and-white films
1940s Swedish films